Catholic–Lutheran dialogue is a series of discussions which began during July 1964 as an outgrowth of the Second Vatican Council. These gatherings reflect the new openness of the Catholic Church to dialogue with other Christian denominations as well as other religions. These dialogues have been primarily between representatives of the Lutheran World Federation and representatives of the Pontifical Council for Promoting Christian Unity.

The Lutheran–Roman Catholic dialogue within the United States have been conducted under the auspices of the U.S. Bishops' Committee for Ecumenical and Interreligious Affairs and the USA National Committee of the Lutheran World Federation. The Lutheran–Roman Catholic Dialogue brought the Evangelical Lutheran Church in America and the Lutheran Church–Missouri Synod (LCMS) together to dialogue with the American Roman Catholic community. The LCMS has not participated in all discussions. Unlike the Evangelical Lutheran Church in America, the LCMS has not come to an agreement with the Roman Catholic Church due to differences in the understanding of various issues including faith, grace and sin.

Since the Second Vatican Council, the Catholic–Lutheran dialogue culminated in the Joint Declaration on the Doctrine of Justification (1999), and the Joint statement on the occasion of the Joint Catholic-Lutheran Commemoration of the Reformation (2016), which essentially resolved the core theological conflict of Martin Luther and subsequent adversaries. This conflict was further eased by the Anglican Communion doing the same.

Rounds of discussion
Between July 1964 and 2010 over 50 sessions have been held taking up eleven rounds of topics :
 I. The Status of the Nicene Creed as Dogma of the Church (1965)
 II. One Baptism for the Remission of Sins (1966)
 III. The Eucharist as Sacrifice (1968)
 IV. Eucharist and Ministry (1970)
 V. Papal Primacy and the Universal Church (1973)
 VI. Teaching Authority & Infallibility in the Church (1978)
 VII. Justification by Faith (1983)
 VIII. The One Mediator, the Saints, and Mary (1990)
 IX. Scripture and Tradition (1995)
 X. The Church as Koinonia of Salvation: Its Structures and Ministries (2004)
 XI. The Hope for Eternal Life (2010)
XII.  Ministries of Teaching (2011)

Subsequent events

Significant events following these dialogues included a joint statement on the doctrine of Justification by Faith issued in 1983 and the Joint Declaration on the Doctrine of Justification issued on October 31, 1999. In 2010, the Lutheran–Roman Catholic dialogue completed a common statement entitled The Hope of Eternal Life.  In 2015, Lutherans and Roman Catholics jointly issued the Declaration on the Way: Church, Ministry and Eucharist,  an ecumenical document marking greater visible unity between Catholics and Lutherans.

The Lutheran World Federation and the Pontifical Council for Promoting Christian Unity hosted a joint Ecumenical Commemoration event at Lund Cathedral in Lund, Sweden, on October 31, 2016. This was a shared Lutheran–Roman Catholic commemoration of the 499th anniversary of the posting by Martin Luther of The Ninety-Five Theses at All Saint's Church in Wittenberg, Germany, in 1517.

Documents 
Lutheran–Roman Catholic Joint Commission
"First Official Report of the Joint Working Group" (1966)
"The Gospel and the Church" (1972) 
The Eucharist (1978)
"Statement on the Augsburg Confession" (1980)
"Ways to Community" (1980)
"The Ministry in the Church" (1981)
"Martin Luther - Witness to Jesus Christ" (1983)
"Facing Unity. Models, Forms and Phases of Catholic-Lutheran Church Fellowship" (1984)
"Church and Justification" (1994)
Lutheran–Roman Catholic dialogue in the USA
The Status of the Nicene Creed as Dogma of the Church (July 7, 1965)
One Baptism for the Remission of Sins (February 13, 1966)
The Eucharist (October 1, 1967)
Eucharist and Ministry (1970)
Differing Attitudes Toward Papal Primacy (1973)
Teaching Authority and Infallibility in the Church (1978)
Justification by Faith (1983)
The One Mediator, the Saints, and Mary (1990)
Scripture and Tradition (1995)
The Church as Koinonia of Salvation: Its Structures and Ministries (2004)
The Hope of Eternal Life (November 1, 2010)
Ecumenical Working Group of Lutheran and Roman Catholic theologians in Germany
"The Condemnations of the Reformation Era - Do They Still Divide?" (1986)
Lutheran–Roman Catholic Commission on Unity
From Conflict to Communion: Lutheran–Catholic Common Commemoration of the Reformation in 2017 (2013)
Joint Declarations
Joint Declaration on the Doctrine of Justification (1999)

See also
Ecumenical meetings and documents on Mary

References

External links
 Historical Joint Declaration on the Doctrine of Justification. October 31, 1999
 Documents and News Releases Produced by the Lutheran-Catholic Dialogue in the United States

Christian organizations established in 1964
Catholic organizations established in the 20th century
Catholic–Protestant ecumenism
United States Conference of Catholic Bishops